The name Yvonne has been used for three tropical cyclones, worldwide.

 Tropical Storm Yvonne (1945) – a tropical storm that formed over the central Philippines and struck Vietnam.
 Cyclone Yvonne (1971) – a tropical storm that formed in the Australian region of the Indian Ocean; renamed Lise when it crossed into the South-West Indian basin.
 Cyclone Yvonne (1974) – a tropical storm that struck Australia's Cape York Peninsula.

Pacific typhoon set index articles
Australian region cyclone set index articles